Derek Kwok Chi-kin (born 10 October 1976) is a Hong Kong film director and screenwriter. He won the 28th Hong Kong Film Awards for Best New Director with his film The Moss.

Director 
2007 The Pye-Dog
2008 The Moss
2010 Gallants
2010 Frozen
2013 Journey to the West: Conquering the Demons
2014 As the Light Goes Out 
2015 Full Strike
2017 The Tales of Wukong

Screenplay 
2000 Skyline Cruisers
2001 2002
2002 The Mummy
2002 Dry Wood Fierce Fire
2004 Leaving Me, Loving You
2007 The Pye-Dog
2008 The Moss
2010 Gallants
2010 Frozen
2013 Journey to the West: Conquering the Demons
2014 As the Light Goes Out

References

External links 

Living people
Hong Kong film directors
Hong Kong screenwriters
1976 births